At the 1972 Summer Olympics in Munich, seven events in sprint canoe racing were contested, and for the first time at the Olympic Games, four events in slalom canoeing were also contested, at the Augsburg Eiskanal.

Medal table

Medal summary

Slalom

Sprint

Men's events

Women's events

The introduction of slalom: A difficult case

During the Congress of the International Canoe Federation (ICF) in 1966 that the Deutscher Kanu-Verband (DKV) decides to make all possible efforts to include canoeing slalom at the Olympic Games.

During the 67th Session of the IOC in Mexico in 1968, Canoe Slalom and Wild-Water Racing asked to be included into the Olympic Programme. The ICF presents an exposed about these two disciplines. The meeting decides to add canoe slalom to the program with the restriction that the event must not take place too far from the Olympic city.

If the proposition was accepted at the Session in June 1969 these two events will be part of the canoeing events that will make up one of the 21 sports of the Olympic Program in 1972.

During the Executive Board meeting in 1969 in Lausanne, Mr. de Coquereaumont said that although the slalom could be held in the centre of Munich, but the river-racing event would have to be held in Garmisch, 300 km from Munich. The Executive Board decided to recommend slalom for Munich Olympic Games, but the question would later be reviewed. However, River-racing was not approved.

The Organizing Committee examines the possibility of building the Canoe-Slalom tracks in Munich about 5–6 km from the Olympic Village. The architects and technical staff examine two possibilities on the Isar River in the center of Munich. But in the construction problem there are some technical difficulties.
The third possibility is to organize the Canoe-Slalom competition in Augsburg, which is about 64 km from Munich too far of the Olympic Village : referencing to the decision which was taken in 1969 the canoe slalom competition have to be held as near as possible to this Village. 
IOC decides that Canoe slalom for the Munich Games will be omitted from the programme if they would have to take place in Augsburg.

Finally, IOC gives final approval to organize events on Eiskanal in Augsburg during the Amsterdam's session in 1970 : Request that the Canoe Slalom for the Munich Games 1972 be
held at Augsburg because a railway service will be ensured between the Olympic Village and Augsburg and will take 30 minutes. However, the decision will be reviewed for the next Olympic Games.

The slalom events will not take part anymore of the program for the Montreal Games in 1976. This experiment will not be repeated before in 1992 in Barcelona.

Ideological confrontation during slalom events
The decision to include canoe slalom events at the Olympic program was taken during the Cold War. Moreover, Germany was the symbol of world division. Consequently, the Olympic events become the scene of a confrontation between the West Germans and East Germans. Each seeking to assert its own ideological model. It was the West German who have the advantage because the Olympic Games take place in Munich and slalom events take place at Augsburg on Eiskanal. So, they used to train in this whitewater stadium.
However, the East German National Federation canoe sends his national coach, Mr. Lempert in West-Germany. He pretends to be an entrepreneur of the International Canoe Federation. He can reproduce the plans of Eiskanal. A reproduction of the whitewater stadium is built around Zwickau. The two Germanys are again equal.
Finally it is the East Germans who win with four gold medals and one bronze against three silver medals and one bronze for West Germany.

References

See also
1972 Summer Olympics official report Volume 3. pp. 487–99. 
 

 
1972 Summer Olympics events
1972